Events from the year 1341 in Ireland.

Incumbent 
Lord: Edward III

Events 

 King Toirdhealbhach of Connacht captures Roscommon castle.
 23 January – Ross loses its rights as an open port.
 22 February – Alexander Bicknor, Archbishop of Dublin is appointed 'custos and acting justiciar. 
 16 March – John Morice is appointed deputy justiciar.
 5 May – Elizabeth de Burgh, daughter of William Donn, 4th Earl of Ulster, is betrothed to Lionel of Antwerp, 1st Duke of Clarence (see 9 September).
 24 July – general resumption of all grants made since the death of Edward I.
 27 July – ordinance excluding all but Englishmen beneficed in England from holding office in Ireland.
 2 August – 2 October  – deputy justicier campaigns in Leinster against Mac Murchada.
 9 September – Elizabeth de Burgh and Lionel of Antwerp are married. 
 October – parliament at Dublin is adjourned to Kilkenny (held in November). Petitions critical of administration are sent to Edward III.
 25 November – order for examination of exchequer and its officials.

Births

Deaths 
Richard de Havering (or Richard de Haverings), a medieval Roman Catholic clergyman who briefly became Archbishop of Dublin.
Roger Utlagh, or Roger Outlawe (b. 1260) was a leading Irish cleric, judge and statesman who held the office of Lord Chancellor of Ireland.

References 

 http://www.ucc.ie/celt/published/T100001B/index.html
 http://www.ucc.ie/celt/published/T100005C/index.html
 http://www.ucc.ie/celt/published/T100010B/index.html

 
1340s in Ireland
Ireland
Years of the 14th century in Ireland
Ireland